This bibliography of Ashraf Ali Thanwi is a selected list of generally available scholarly resources related to Ashraf Ali Thanwi, a leading Islamic scholar, philosopher, writer, preacher, reformer, the author of about one thousands books. He didn't write an autobiography during his lifetime. However, Aziz al-Hasan Ghouri, an authorized disciple of Thanwi, compiled a book from 1935 to 1943, into four volumes entitled Ashraf al-Sawaneh, which is the first and most important book and prime source on the biography of Thanwi. Another Maqalat Hakeemul Ummat was compiled in 34 volumes under the supervision of Taqi Usmani, collected from about 350 publications of Thanwi. This list will include his biographies, theses written on him and articles published about him in various journals, newspapers, encyclopedias, seminars, websites etc. in APA style.

Encyclopedias

Biographies

Theses

Journals

Newspapers

Seminars

Websites

Other

Theses

Books

Journals

References 

Ashraf Ali Thanwi
Islam-related lists
Bibliographies of people
Indian biographies
Deobandi-related bibliographies
Lists of books